The Polonaises Op. posth[umous] include Frédéric Chopin's polonaises that were unpublished during his life.

Chopin's father Nicolas Chopin published these works on behalf of his son. The Polonaises in G minor and B-flat major are among these posthumous pieces and relative.

KK IIa No. 1: Polonaise in G minor (1817)
Polonaise in G minor was either the first or second of Chopin's Polonaises, the other one being Polonaise in B-flat major. The piece was written in 1817, when he was only seven and was dedicated to Lady Wiktoria Skarbek, the wife of his godfather.

The piece consists of two main parts; a minor dance section which lasts 12 measures, and major section, which consists of a variation of the first dance along with a trio. This goes on for 26 measures, by which it then repeats to the minor dance section.

KK IVa No. 1: Polonaise in B-flat major (1817)
Polonaise in B-flat major, or B. 3 was also written when Chopin was seven. Though Chopin asked to have it burned after death, it was published in 1879.

KK IVa No. 2: Polonaise in A-flat major (1821)
This piece was dedicated to his teacher, Wojciech Żywny (1756–1842) and is commonly referred to as B.5. It was not first published until 1901.

KK IVa No. 3: Polonaise in G-sharp minor (1822)
Polonaise in G-sharp minor, was not published until a year after his death in 1850.

KK IVa No. 5: Polonaise in B-flat minor "Adieu à Guillaume Kolberg" (1826)
This polonaise quotes the tenor cavatina "Vieni fra queste braccia" from Rossini's opera La gazza ladra, which Chopin had seen with his father's friend, the composer Oskar Kolberg.

KK IVa No. 8: Polonaise in G-flat major (1829)
B.6, or Polonaise in G-flat major, was the final polonaise that was published posthumously.

Numbering systems
On some CDs, these pieces are respectively designated as "Nos. 11, 12, 13, 14, 15 & 16" in the order presented above. Some other CDs give a different numbering system, which comparatively gives "Nos. 15, 16, 11, 12, 13 & 14" or "Nos. 15, 16, 13, 14, 11 & 12".

References

Polonaises by Frédéric Chopin
1817 compositions
1821 compositions
1822 compositions
1826 compositions
1829 compositions
Compositions by Frédéric Chopin published posthumously
 Compositions in G minor
 Compositions in B-flat major
 Compositions in A-flat major
 Compositions in G-sharp minor
 Compositions in B-flat minor
 Compositions in G-flat major